Ayer may refer to:

Places
 Ayer, Massachusetts, United States
 Ayer (CDP), Massachusetts, the central village in the town of Ayer
 Ayer (MBTA station), commuter rail station
 Aller, Asturias, a municipality in Spain known in Asturian as Ayer
 Ayer, Switzerland, a municipality in the Val d'Anniviers, canton of Valais

People
Ayer (surname)
 Iyer (also spelled Ayer or Ayyar), a Hindu Brahmin community from India

Music
 "Ayer" (Enrique Iglesias song), a song by Enrique Iglesias
 "Ayer" (Gloria Estefan song), by singer-songwriter Gloria Estefan
 "Ayer" (Luis Miguel song), 1993 song by Luis Miguel 
 "Ayer", 1992 song by Juan Luis Guerra and 440 from the album Areíto
 "In the Ayer" by rappers Flo Rida, Tiffany Villarreal, and will.i.am

Other uses
 N. W. Ayer & Son, the first advertising agency in the United States